Minowa may refer to:

People
Minowa (surname)

Places
, town in  Kamiina District, Nagano Prefecture, Japan
, dam in Nagano Prefecture
, castle in  Takasaki, Gunma Prefecture, Japan
, train station in Taitō, Tokyo, Japan

Other uses
7068 Minowa, main-belt asteroid